Seyed Zia Arabshahi (born 1958.06.06) is a retired Iranian football midfielder. He is a former member of the Iranian national team.

Club career
At the age of 16, he joined Pas Tehran. After three years he was transferred to Persepolis FC, where he played for several seasons until 1990.

International career
He played for Team Melli for a few years during the 1980s. Zia Arabshahi's memorable goal for the national team was the second goal against China in the 1984 Asian Cup in Singapore, which was selected the best goal of the tournament.

References

1960 births
Iran international footballers
Iranian footballers
Living people
Pas players
Persepolis F.C. players
1984 AFC Asian Cup players
1988 AFC Asian Cup players
Footballers at the 1986 Asian Games
Association football midfielders
Asian Games competitors for Iran